Kyoe Tann is a 2008 Burmese drama film, directed by Mee Pwar starring Kyaw Hein, Kyaw Ye Aung, Soe Myat Thuzar and Htun Eaindra Bo. It was based on the popular novel "Kyoe Tann", written by Khin Khin Htoo. It was the last film of Kyaw Hein.

Cast
Kyaw Hein as Kyauk Ni
Kyaw Ye Aung as Hla Saung
Soe Myat Thuzar as Ma Kyawt
Htun Eaindra Bo as Hla Sein
Zaw Win Naing as Nga Oar

Award

References

2008 films
2000s Burmese-language films
Burmese drama films
Films shot in Myanmar
2008 drama films